Eubranchus is a genus of aeolid nudibranch in the family Eubranchidae.

The name Eubranchus has been placed on the Official List by ICZN Opinion 774.

Species
Species within the genus Eubranchus include:

 Eubranchus adarensis Odhner, 1934
 Eubranchus agrius (O'Donoghue, 1922)
 Eubranchus arci Ortea, 1981
 Eubranchus amazighi Tamsouri, Carmona, Moukrim & Cervera, 2015
 Eubranchus capellinii (Trinchese, 1879)
 Eubranchus cingulatus (Alder & Hancock, 1847)
 Eubranchus conicla (Er. Marcus, 1958)
 Eubranchus convenientis Ortea & Caballer, 2002
 Eubranchus cucullus Behrens, 1985  
 Eubranchus doriae (Trinchese, 1874)
 Eubranchus echizenicus Baba, 1975  
 Eubranchus eibesfeldti Ortea, Caballer & Bacallado, 2003
 Eubranchus exiguus (Alder and Hancock, 1848) 
 Eubranchus falklandicus (Eliot, 1907)
 Eubranchus fuegiensis Odhner, 1926
 Eubranchus glacialis (Thiele, 1912)
 Eubranchus horii Baba, 1960
 Eubranchus inabai Baba, 1964
 Eubranchus leopoldoi Caballer, Ortea & Espinosa, 2001 
 Eubranchus mandapamensis (Rao, 1968)
 Eubranchus montraveli Risbec, 1937
 Eubranchus occidentalis MacFarland, 1966
 Eubranchus ocellatus (Alder & Hancock, 1864)
 Eubranchus odhneri (Derjugin & Gurjanova, 1926)
 Eubranchus olivaceus (O'Donoghue, 1922)   
 Eubranchus prietoi Llera & Ortea, 1981
 Eubranchus productus (Farran, 1905)
 Eubranchus rubeolus Burn, 1964
 Eubranchus rubrocerata Edmunds, 2015 
 Eubranchus rubropunctatus Edmunds, 1969  
 Eubranchus rupium (Møller, 1842)
 Eubranchus rustyus (Er. Marcus, 1961) 
 Eubranchus sanjuanensis Roller, 1972 
 Eubranchus sp. 4 - fireworks nudibranch
 Eubranchus sp. 5 - candelabra nudibranch   
 Eubranchus steinbecki Behrens, 1987
 Eubranchus tanzanensis Edmunds, 1969
 Eubranchus telesforoi Ortea, Caballer & Bacallado, 2002
 Eubranchus toledanoi Ortea & Caballer, 2002 
 Eubranchus tricolor Forbes, 1838
 Eubranchus vascoi Ortea, Caballer & Moro, 2002
 Eubranchus virginalis (Baba, 1949) 
 Eubranchus vittatus (Alder and Hancock, 1842) 
 Eubranchus yolandae Hermosillo & Valdes, 2007

Species brought into synonymy
 Eubranchus coniclus (Er. Marcus, 1958): synonym of Eubranchus conicla (Er. Marcus, 1958)
 Eubranchus fidenciae Ortea, Moro & Espinosa, 1999: synonym of Cuthona fidenciae (Ortea, Moro & Espinosa, 1999)
 Eubranchus misakiensis Baba, 1960: synonym of  Leostyletus misakiensis (Baba, 1960)

References

Eubranchidae
Taxa named by Edward Forbes
Gastropod genera